Scott John Warner (born 3 December 1983) in Rochdale is an English retired professional footballer who played as a midfielder for Rochdale in the Football League.

External links

1983 births
Living people
Footballers from Rochdale
English footballers
Association football midfielders
Rochdale A.F.C. players
Radcliffe F.C. players
Hyde United F.C. players
English Football League players